College Green, a division of the parliamentary borough of Dublin, was a parliamentary constituency which returned one Member of Parliament (MP) to the House of Commons of the United Kingdom from 1885 until 1922. From 1918 to 1921, it was also used a constituency for Dáil Éireann

From the dissolution of 1922, the area was no longer represented in the UK Parliament.

Boundaries
This constituency comprised part of the city of Dublin. It was predominantly on the northside of the city, but crossed the River Liffey to include College Green.

From 1885 to 1918, it was defined as:

From 1918 to 1922, it was defined as:

History
Prior to the 1885 general election, the city was the undivided two-member Dublin City constituency. Under the Redistribution of Seats Act 1885, Dublin was divided into four divisions: College Green, Dublin Harbour, St Stephen's Green and St Patrick's. This was a strongly Nationalist area, which moved after the 1916 Easter Rising to supporting Sinn Féin. In the 1918 election, Sinn Féin got more than three-quarters of the vote.

Under the Redistribution of Seats (Ireland) Act 1918, the city was allocated seven seats: in addition to the four existing constituencies, the new divisions were Clontarf, St James's and St Michan's.

At the 1918 general election, Sinn Féin issued an election manifesto in which it called for a "establishment of a constituent assembly comprising persons chosen by Irish constituencies". After the election, Sinn Féin invited all those elected for Irish constituencies to sit as members of Dáil Éireann, termed Teachta Dála (or TD, known in English as a Deputy). In practice, only those elected for Sinn Féin attended. This included Seán T. O'Kelly, elected for College Green. He was the presiding officer of the First Dáil (with the title Ceann Comhairle) from 22 January 1919. His appointment as Ceann Comhairle was confirmed 1 April 1919.

Under the Government of Ireland Act 1920, the area was combined with the Dublin Harbour Division to form Dublin Mid, a 4-seat constituency for the Southern Ireland House of Commons and a single constituency at Westminster. At the 1921 election for the Southern Ireland House of Commons, the four seats were won uncontested by Sinn Féin, who treated it as part of the election to the Second Dáil. Seán T. O'Kelly was one of the four TDs for Dublin Mid.

Under s. 1(4) of the Irish Free State (Agreement) Act 1922, no writ was to be issued "for a constituency in Ireland other than a constituency in Northern Ireland". Therefore, no vote was held in Dublin Mid at the 1922 United Kingdom general election on 15 November 1922, shortly before the Irish Free State left the United Kingdom on 6 December 1922.

Members of Parliament

Elections

Elections in the 1880s

Elections in the 1890s

Elections in the 1900s

Elections in the 1910s

See also
 Historic Dáil constituencies

Notes, citations and sources

Citations

Sources

External links
 Dáil Éireann Members Database Office of the Houses of the Oireachtas
 Dublin Historic Maps: Parliamentary & Dail Constituencies 1780–1969 (a work in progress)

Westminster constituencies in County Dublin (historic)
Dublin College Green
Constituencies of the Parliament of the United Kingdom established in 1885
Constituencies of the Parliament of the United Kingdom disestablished in 1922